Z Kikhonbou Newmai is an Indian politician and member of the Bharatiya Janata Party. Newmai was earlier elected to Manipur Legislative Assembly from the Tamei constituency as an Indian National Congress candidate in 2012 Manipur Legislative Assembly election.

References 

People from Tamenglong district
Bharatiya Janata Party politicians from Manipur
Manipur MLAs 2012–2017
Living people
Manipur politicians
Indian National Congress politicians
21st-century Indian politicians
Year of birth missing (living people)